Joanne Coles (born 25 June 1992) is an English woman's international motorcycle trials rider. She was British Women's Trials Champion in 2010.

Biography

Coles was a member of the winning British Women's Teams at the Trial de Nations in 2009, 2013 and 2014. In 2010, she won the British Women's Trials Championship as well as being runner-up to Laia Sanz in the European Championships that year and 3rd in the World Championships.

National Trials Championship Career

European Women's Trials Championship

World Trials Championship

Honors

 British Women's Trials Champion 2010

See also

FIM Trial World Championship
FIM Trial European Championship

References 

1992 births
Living people
Sportspeople from Derby
English sportswomen
English motorcycle racers
Motorcycle trials riders
Female motorcycle racers